Jennifer Shilling (née Ehlenfeldt; born July 4, 1969) is an American Democratic politician, lobbyist, and former state legislator.  She was a member of the Wisconsin State Senate for nine years and was senate minority leader from 2015 to 2020.  She previously served 10 years in the Wisconsin State Assembly, representing the city of La Crosse and La Crosse County.

Background
Shilling was born Jennifer Ehlenfeldt on July 4, 1969, in Oshkosh, Wisconsin, to Richard and Lynn Ehlenfeldt. She graduated from Buffalo Grove High School in Buffalo Grove, Illinois. She served as a La Crosse County Supervisor from 1990 to 1992, and earned a joint B.A. in political science and public administration at the University of Wisconsin–La Crosse, graduating in 1992. Prior to being elected to the State Assembly, she worked as a legislative aide for Democratic United States Representative Ron Kind and later for State Representative Mark Meyer.

During her first week of work as an aide for Meyer, on January 8, 1993, Shilling's parents and five employees were murdered at the family's restaurant in Palatine, Illinois, during a robbery-murder now known as the Brown's Chicken massacre. Both of Shilling's younger sisters were also scheduled to be at the restaurant that night, but happened not to be present at the time of the killing.

State Assembly
In 2000, Ehlenfeldt was elected to succeed her boss, Mark Meyer, in the 95th Assembly District (Meyer was making a successful bid for the State Senate). She won her primary election with ease and won the general election with 13,789 votes to 11,530 for Republican nominee Deb Suchla. Subsequent to the November election, she married and had her name changed to Jennifer Shilling. She was assigned to the Assembly's standing committees on financial institutions, health, insurance and personal privacy, as well as the Legislative Advisory Committee to the Wisconsin-Minnesota Boundary Commission.

In the meantime, Shilling graduated from the Bowhay Institute on Legislative Leadership Development and the Citizen's Police Academy in La Crosse. In addition, she was also a member of the Wisconsin Technology Council Board of Directors. In 2001, she was selected to participate in the American Council of Young Political Leaders delegation to the Philippines, and in 2002 was the commencement speaker for graduation ceremonies at UW–La Crosse.

Re-elected in 2002, she remained on the financial institutions, health and insurance committees, and was also assigned to the committees on colleges and universities, and on highway safety. In 2008, running unopposed, Shilling won 97% of the vote.

State Senate
On April 9, 2011, Shilling formally announced her intention to run in the Senate recall election against Republican Dan Kapanke. That summer, she defeated him in the recall election winning 55% of the vote, and took office August 26, 2011.

In March 2012, Bill Feehan, a La Crosse businessman and county board supervisor, announced that he would run against Shilling in the 2012 general election. In the newly redistricted district, Shilling took over 58% of the vote, with 51,091 votes to Feehan's 36,527.

In 2014, Shilling was elected Senate Minority Leader by fellow Democrats. Her top priorities include increasing spending on education, both at the K-12 and college level.

Shilling was reelected in the November 2016 election.

In 2020, Shilling announced she would step down as Minority Leader and would not seek re-election in 2020. On May 15, 2020, Shilling resigned from the Wisconsin Senate.

After the senate
Shilling announced after her senate resignation in 2020 that she would go to work as a lobbyist for Dairyland Power Cooperative—a La Crosse-based energy generation and transmission cooperative.

Personal life
She and her husband, Chris, have two children.

References

External links
Wisconsin State Senator Jennifer Shilling official government website

Financial information (state office) at OpenSecrets

 Dairyland Power Cooperative

|-

|-

1969 births
21st-century American politicians
21st-century American women politicians
County supervisors in Wisconsin
Living people
Democratic Party members of the Wisconsin State Assembly
Politicians from La Crosse, Wisconsin
Politicians from Oshkosh, Wisconsin
University of Wisconsin–La Crosse alumni
Democratic Party Wisconsin state senators
Women state legislators in Wisconsin